Gone on That Bay is the debut studio album by American rapper Frayser Boy. It was released on August 26, 2003 via Hypnotize Minds. Audio production was handled by DJ Paul and Juicy J, who also guest appeared on the album together with Lil Wyte, Crunchy Black, Lord Infamous and UGK.

Track listing

Chart history

References

External links

2003 debut albums
Frayser Boy albums
Albums produced by DJ Paul
Albums produced by Juicy J